is a dry Japanese condiment sprinkled on top of cooked rice, vegetables, and fish, or used as an ingredient in . It typically consists of a mixture of dried fish, sesame seeds, chopped seaweed, sugar, salt, and monosodium glutamate.

 is often brightly colored and flaky. It can have a slight fish or seafood flavoring and may be spicy and/or sweet. It can be used in Japanese cooking for pickling foods and for rice balls.

History

To address calcium deficits in the Japanese population, Yoshimaru developed a mixture of ground fish bones with roast sesame seeds, poppy seeds, and seaweed that was made into a powder. This product, which he called , is generally considered the precursor to contemporary . A food company in Kumamato later acquired the product and was able to sell it commercially. It was initially sold in a flask-like container shaped with a narrow neck to prevent moisture from seeping into the product.

Years after Yoshimaru's , a grocery retailer in Fukushima City named Seiichirō Kai developed a mixture consisting of white croaker and powdered kombu and other ingredients simmered with a soy sauce-based broth. Kai called his product ; it was popular on its release. Although  was initially considered a luxury item for the affluent who were able to consume white rice on a regular basis, it later was made accessible to the Japanese working class.

The product was commercialized on the basis that it provided a good source of protein and calcium.  was made widely available as it was dispensed to those serving in the Japanese military starting in World War I.

The term  was used generically to describe the product starting in 1959 with the formation of the National  Association. Since 1959,  products are usually differentiated by their particular ingredients, such as salmon  and sesame-and-salt .

See also
  – a type of  mostly consisting of cooked black sesame seeds and sea salt crystals
 List of sesame seed dishes
  – a soup made by sprinkling seasonings (such as ) and toppings over cooked rice, then covering with brewed green tea
  – a chilli-based spice mixture similar to  mainly used on noodles, soups and 
 Dry chutney

References

External links

Japanese condiments
Sesame dishes